Toto (also referred to as tuoto and toe-toe bulla) is a small coconut cake in Jamaican cuisine served as a snack or dessert. The cake is typically prepared with shredded coconut, brown sugar, flour, baking soda and powder, and coconut milk. It may also be added with some flavorings such as allspice, nutmeg, ginger, and salt.

Toto is a Jamaican delicacy that is served at most family gatherings.

History
Toto got its origin from slavery. Whenever they were hungry from being underfed, they would combine coconut, molasses and flour, bake it with fire coals laced on top of a metal sheet covering the cake pan and fire beneath the cake pan.

Misconceptions 
It was stated in the book Jamaican food: history, biology, culture, published in 2008, that the food appears to have been invented in the twentieth century, and that by the end of the twentieth century they were difficult to find. That claim may be erroneous as the food is typically made in homes and not sold widely in stores. Toto recipes are passed down within families, some claiming to have recipes from the 19th century. Toto is not related to Coco Bread.

See also

Gizzada
Grater cake
 List of cakes
 List of Jamaican dishes
 Coco bread

References

Jamaican desserts
Foods containing coconut